Punnett is an English surname. Notable people with the surname include: 

 Ian Punnett (born 1960), American radio broadcaster, author, professor, and Episcopal deacon
 Phyllis Joyce McClean Punnett (1917–2004), Vincentian musician and writer
 Reginald Punnett (1875–1967), British geneticist